Fairy Tail is an anime series adapted from the manga of the same title by Hiro Mashima. Produced by A-1 Pictures and Satelight, and directed by Shinji Ishihira, it was broadcast on TV Tokyo from 12 October 2009, to 30 March 2013. It later continued its run on 5 April 2014, and ended on 26 March 2016. A third and final series premiered on 7 October 2018. The series follows the adventures of Natsu Dragneel, a member of the Fairy Tail wizards' guild who is searching for the dragon Igneel, and partners with Lucy Heartfilia, a celestial wizard.

The series uses 52 different pieces of theme music: 26 opening themes and 26 ending themes. Several CDs containing the theme music and other tracks have been released by Pony Canyon and Avex Group. The first DVD compilation was released on 29 January 2010, with individual volumes being released monthly. The Southeast Asian network Animax Asia aired part of the series locally in English.

In 2011, Funimation licensed the first season for an English-language release in North America. The Funimation-dubbed episodes aired on the Funimation Channel. The first DVD set, containing 12 episodes, was released on 22 November 2011. Similarly sized sets followed, with 14 sets released as of 2 December 2014. Funimation also acquired the rights to simulcast the relaunched anime episodes.

Series overview

Episode list

Season 1 (2009–2010)

Season 2 (2010–11)

Season 3 (2011)

Season 4 (2011–12)

Season 5 (2012)

Season 6 (2012–13)

Season 7 (2014–15)

Season 8 (2016)

Season 9 (2018–19)

Films

Original video animations

Home media release

Japanese

English

Notes

References

External links
 Kodansha's Fairy Tail anime official Japanese website 
 

Fairy Tail